The numbered roads in Bruce County account for approximately  of roads in the Canadian province of Ontario.
These roads include King's Highways that are signed and maintained by the province, as well as county roads under the jurisdiction of the Bruce County Transportation and Environmental Services Department. The third type of existing roadway in the county is locally maintained municipal roads, many of which are concession roads and sidelines; these are beyond the scope of this article.

The 29 numbered routes provide year-round access to the mostly rural municipality. The shortest numbered road is Bruce Road25, which travels  from Highway 21 to the Lake Huron shoreline.

Types of roads

King's Highways 
As in the rest of Ontario, the provincially maintained highways in Bruce are designated with a shield-shaped sign topped with a crown. The highway number is in the centre, with the word ONTARIO below. These signs are known as shields, but may be referred to as reassurance markers.
Provincially maintained highways generally have greater construction standards than municipally or locally maintained roads.
Although they are usually one lane in either direction, several short sections with two lanes in one direction as a passing lane exist along the highways.

County roads 
There are 27 numbered county roads in Bruce County. County roads are signed with a flowerpot-shaped sign, as are most regional and county roads in Ontario. The road number appears in the centre of the sign, with the word BRUCE above and the word COUNTY below. Like King's Highways, these signs are known as shields.

Roads

King's Highways

County roads 
County roads are referred to on signage as Bruce Road X. The following table lists existing numbered roads maintained by the County of Bruce. The county also maintains Grey–Bruce Line between Scone and Highway21 as an unnumbered county road.

Notes

References

Route maps 

Bruce
Transport in Bruce County